Mary Sargeant Gove Nichols (August 10, 1810 – May 30, 1884), also known by her pen name Mary Orme, was an American women's rights and health reform advocate, hydrotherapist, vegetarian and writer.

Life

Nichols was born in Goffstown, New Hampshire. At a young age, she suffered from four miscarriages and a chronic illness. She became a woman's health care advocate and spread her message through lectures, clinics, and her writings. Mary Gove Nichols raised children, treated patients, published writings, and sought to live what she believed.

Nichols first marriage was to Hiram Gove, an unsuccessful businessman. Gove married Mary expecting financial support and obedience from his wife. The Goves moved to Lynn, Massachusetts where Mary ran a girls' school, and this was where she began her health reform career.

In 1841, she took her daughter and moved back with her parents leaving her husband behind; he eventually agreed to a divorce in 1847 or 1848. After being abused, both sexually and emotionally, she made it her life's work to inform women of their bodies and their opportunities. In July 1848, she remarried to Thomas Low Nichols, a writer who also had an interest in health reform and progressive views on women's rights. Together they planned to open a School of Health, School of Progress and School of Life in a three-story building they leased. They moved to England at the outset of the Civil War.

Nichols wrote novels and stories under the pseudonym Mary Orme. She wrote short stories for Godey's Lady's Book. Edgar Allan Poe praised her fiction. 

Nichols died in Brompton, London on May 30, 1884 from breast cancer. Her surviving daughter by her first husband, Elma Gove, became a painter.

Natural hygiene and free love advocacy

Nichols studied the writings of Sylvester Graham and became a vegetarian around 1837. She was an influential proponent in the natural hygiene movement. She lectured to all-female audiences on anatomy, physiology, and hygiene to relieve women of what she saw as unnecessary physical and mental suffering. She recommended that women exercise daily, breathe fresh air, shower with cold water, avoid the fashionable tight-laced corsets of the day, and abstain from coffee and meat. 

Nichols lectured for the Ladies Physiological Society, an offshoot of the American Physiological Society. She has been described as the "first woman in America to lecture on topics of anatomy and physiology and she included lessons on vegetarianism, and prevention and cure of sickness." Nichols believed that cancer could be cured by a vegetarian diet.

In 1851, Nichols and her husband Thomas Low Nichols founded a "water-cure" clinic, the American Hydropathic Institute in New York City. It offered a fee of $50, for people to become qualified "water cure" doctors. The institute is cited as a historical example of quackery. Nichols and her husband were advocates of bathing in cold water, fasting and occasional wet-sheet packing. 

Nichols contributed to the Water-Cure Journal, and published with her husband Nichols’ Journal of Health, Water-Cure, and Human Progress (1853–1858). Nichols and her husband advocated free love and the belief that marriage was evil. She was the leading female advocate and the woman most looked up to in the free love movement, and her autobiography (Mary Lyndon: Or, Revelations of a Life: An Autobiography, 1860) became the first argument against marriage written from a woman's point of view. These beliefs alienated Nichols and her husband from others in the hydropathic community. In 1855, they moved to Cincinnati and opened the Memnonia Institute, a "school of life" at Yellow Springs, Ohio in 1856. The name of the institute referred to the goddess of water, reflecting their interest in hydropathy, but also promoted asceticism, fasting, and spiritual penance. It had few members, lasting only one year. They both attended seances, believing themselves to be in communication with spirits, and converted to Catholicism.

Herbert M. Shelton's book The Science and Fine Art of Natural Hygiene is dedicated to Gove and other natural hygienists.

Selected publications

Experience in Water-Cure (1849)
Marriage: Its History, Character, and Results [with Thomas Low Nicholas, 1854]
Mary Lyndon: Or, Revelations of a Life: An Autobiography (1860)
A Woman's Work in Water Cure and Sanitary Education (1874)

References

Further reading

Hilary Marland; Jane Adams. (2009). Hydropathy at Home: The Water Cure and Domestic Healing in Mid-Nineteenth-Century Britain. Bulletin of the History of Medicine. 83 (3): 499–529.
Thomas Low Nichols. (1887). Nichols' Health Manual: Being Also a Memorial of the Life and Work of Mrs. Mary S. Gove Nichols. E. W. Allen.
Janet Hubly Noever. (1991). Passionate Rebel: The Life of Mary Gove Nichols, 1810-1884. University of Oklahoma.

External links

The Feminist Origins of “Eight Cups a Day”. Excerpted from Marketplace of the Marvelous: The Strange Origins of Modern Medicine by Erika Janik.

1810 births
1884 deaths
19th-century American women writers
Activists from New Hampshire
Alternative cancer treatment advocates
American feminists
American health and wellness writers
American suffragists
American temperance activists
American vegetarianism activists
American women's rights activists
Deaths from breast cancer
Fasting advocates
Hydrotherapists
Orthopaths
People associated with physical culture
People from Goffstown, New Hampshire
Pseudoscientific diet advocates